Cold brew coffee, also called cold water extraction or cold pressing, is the process of steeping coffee grounds in water at cool temperatures for an extended period. Coarse-ground beans are soaked in water for about 12 to 24 hours.

The water is normally kept at room temperature, but chilled water can also be used. After the grounds have been steeped, they are filtered out of the water using a paper coffee filter, a fine metal sieve, a French press, or felt. The result is a coffee concentrate that is diluted with water or milk, and is even sometimes served hot, but often served chilled, over ice, or blended with ice and other ingredients such as chocolate.

History
Cold brew coffee originated in Japan, where it has been a traditional method of coffee brewing for centuries. Slow-drip cold brew, also known as Kyoto-style, or as Dutch coffee in East Asia (after the name of coffee essences brought to Asia by the Dutch), refers to a process in which water is dripped through coffee grounds at room temperature over the course of many hours. Cold brew can be infused with nitrogen to make nitro cold brew coffee.

Taste
Because the ground coffee beans in cold-brewed coffee never come into contact with heated water, the process of leaching flavor from the beans produces a chemical profile different from conventional brewing methods. Coffee beans contain a number of parts that are more soluble at higher temperatures, such as caffeine, oils and fatty acids. The pH of cold and hot brew coffee is similar but cold brew coffee has a lower titratable acid concentration. Both pH and titratable acidity influence taste.

Nitro cold brew

Nitro cold brew is a variation of cold brew coffee that uses the addition of nitrogen gas to create a smooth texture. It was created in the early 2010s.

Production 
Production of Nitro cold brew coffee begins with the making of cold brew coffee. Once the grounds are adequately steeped, the coffee is put into a room-temperature bottle or keg. As the cold brew is poured, it is charged with nitrogen to give it a rich, creamy head of foam, similar to draft beer. Though most beers and soft drinks are infused with carbon dioxide, nitrogen is occasionally used in darker stouts, resulting in a smoother finish. Nitro cold brew is typically served chilled, as ice would damage the foamy top.

History 
Nitro cold brew was first offered at third wave coffee shops in the early 2010s, but the exact origin is disputed. The process is said by Men's Journal to have originated in 2013 at craft coffee houses Cuvee Coffee in Austin, Texas, and Stumptown in Portland, Oregon. However, Esquire gives credit to the draft coffee at The Queens Kickshaw in New York in 2011 as a predecessor. Cuvee Coffee first offered nitro cold brew, on tap, at the Slow Food Quiz Bowl in Austin, Texas, on August 14, 2012.  The Ball Corporation issued a press release citing Cuvee as the first company to can cold brew in their widget cans, and BevNet awarded Cuvee the Best Packaging Innovation, calling them "the first cold brew brand to market a nitrogenated offering". Stumptown and Cuvee began offering canned beverages with a nitrogen disc, a hollow piece of plastic compressed with nitrogen in order to pressurize the can, by 2015. Starbucks introduced the beverage at 500 stores in the summer of 2016, preceded in the Los Angeles market by The Coffee Bean & Tea Leaf. By 2020, Starbucks offered the beverage at more than half of its locations across the United States, making it a staple menu item. Nitro cold brew is available from wholesalers in some markets in kegs. RISE Brewing Co. says it can fill up to 1,500 kegs a day of nitro cold brew coffee.

Further reading

References

Coffee preparation
Coffee
Coffee culture